Irina Valyukevich (born 19 November 1959) is a retired long jumper who represented USSR and later Belarus. Her personal best jump was 7.17 metres, achieved in July 1987 in Bryansk.

Achievements

External links

1959 births
Living people
Soviet female long jumpers
Belarusian female long jumpers
Universiade medalists in athletics (track and field)
Goodwill Games medalists in athletics
Universiade gold medalists for the Soviet Union
Competitors at the 1986 Goodwill Games